Don L. Taylor (born 21 May 1931) was a Progressive Conservative party member of the House of Commons of Canada. He was a teacher.

He was first elected to Parliament at the Cowichan—Malahat—The Islands riding in the 1979 general election after an unsuccessful campaign at Nanaimo—Cowichan—The Islands in the 1974 federal election. After completing one term, the 31st Canadian Parliament, Taylor was defeated in the 1980 election by James Manly of the New Democratic Party. Taylor was a candidate in the 1984 federal election but again lost to Manly.

External links
 

1931 births
Living people
Members of the House of Commons of Canada from British Columbia
Progressive Conservative Party of Canada MPs